Vít Beneš (born 12 August 1988) is a Czech footballer who currently plays for Sigma Olomouc in the Czech First League.

Career
In June 2013, he was chased by Sparta Prague but the Jablonec owner decided not to sell him because of the European campaign of the club.

Honours

Jablonec
Czech Cup: 2012–13
Czech Supercup: 2013

References

External links
 
 
 

1988 births
Living people
Sportspeople from Ústí nad Labem
Czech footballers
Czech Republic under-21 international footballers
Czech First League players
SK Kladno players
FK Jablonec players
Association football defenders
Nemzeti Bajnokság I players
Vasas SC players
Szombathelyi Haladás footballers
SK Sigma Olomouc players
Expatriate footballers in Hungary
Czech expatriate sportspeople in Hungary